Liang Lei (born April 3, 1982) is a male Chinese freestyle wrestler who competed at the 2008 Summer Olympics.  He lost in the second round to Steve Mocco.

Liang was born in Shanxi. His personal best was coming 2nd at the 2006 Asian Championships.

See also
 China at the 2012 Summer Olympics

References
 Profile at 2008teamchina.olympic.cn

External links
 
 

1982 births
Living people
Chinese male sport wrestlers
Olympic wrestlers of China
Sportspeople from Shanxi
Wrestlers at the 2008 Summer Olympics
Asian Games medalists in wrestling
Wrestlers at the 2006 Asian Games
Wrestlers at the 2010 Asian Games
Medalists at the 2010 Asian Games
Asian Games bronze medalists for China
20th-century Chinese people
21st-century Chinese people